Coroieni is a commune in Maramureș County, Transylvania, Romania. It is composed of five villages: Baba (Bába), Coroieni, Dealu Mare (Dombhát), Drăghia (Drágosfalva) and Vălenii Lăpușului (Dánpataka).

References

Communes in Maramureș County
Localities in Transylvania